The 2003 Nigerian Senate election in Kano State was held on April 12, 2003, to elect members of the Nigerian Senate to represent Kano State. Bello Hayatu Gwarzo representing Kano North and Usman Umar Kibiya representing Kano South won on the platform of All Nigeria Peoples Party, while Rufaisanbi Hanga representing Kano Central won on the platform of the Peoples Democratic Party.

Overview

Summary

Results

Kano North 
The election was won by Bello Hayatu Gwarzo of the All Nigeria Peoples Party.

Kano South 
The election was won by Usman Umar Kibiya of the All Nigeria Peoples Party.

Kano Central 
The election was won by Rufaisanbi Hanga of the Peoples Democratic Party.

References 

April 2003 events in Nigeria
Kano State Senate elections
Kan